Paraphryneta is a genus of longhorn beetles of the subfamily Lamiinae, containing the following species:

 Paraphryneta allardi Breuning, 1970
 Paraphryneta guttata (Quedenfeldt, 1888)
 Paraphryneta rubeta Breuning, 1947

References

Phrynetini